Oligospira polei is a species of air-breathing land snails, terrestrial pulmonate gastropod mollusks in the family Acavidae. It is endemic to Sri Lanka.

Description
Shell orange brown with a white shell lip. Juvenile has a yellowish shell. They are mostly ground dwellers.

References

External links

Acavidae
Gastropods described in 1899